The 2011 Seguros Bolívar Open Barranquilla was a professional tennis tournament played on hard courts. It was the first edition of the tournament which was part of the 2011 ATP Challenger Tour. It took place in Barranquilla, Colombia between 28 March – 3 April 2011.

ATP entrants

Seeds

 Rankings are as of March 21, 2011.

Other entrants
The following players received wildcards into the singles main draw:
  Manuel Barros
  Sander Brendmoe
  Javier Martí
  Rogério Dutra da Silva

The following players received entry from the qualifying draw:
  Wayne Odesnik
  Marco Trungelliti
  Dennis Zivkovic
  Martín Vassallo Argüello

Champions

Singles

 Facundo Bagnis def.  Diego Junqueira, 1–6, 7–6(4), 6–0

Doubles

 Flavio Cipolla /  Paolo Lorenzi def.  Alejandro Falla /  Eduardo Struvay, 6–3, 6–4

External links
Official Website
ITF Search
ATP official site

Seguros Bolivar Open Barranquilla
Hard court tennis tournaments
Tennis tournaments in Colombia
Seguros Bolívar Open Barranquilla
2011 in Colombian tennis